Alan Derek Piggott  (27 December 1922 – 6 January 2019) was one of Britain's best known glider pilots and instructors. He had over 5,000 hours on over 153 types of powered aircraft and over 5,000 hours on over 184 types of glider. He was honoured for his work on the instruction and safety of glider pilots. In 1961 he became the first person to make an officially authenticated take-off and flight in a man-powered aircraft. He also worked as a stunt pilot in several feature films.

Early years
Piggott was born in Chadwell Heath, Essex, the son of Rev. William Piggott and Alice Harvey. His father was a conscientious objector in the First World War, led the rent strike against London County Council after the war, and was a frequent speaker at Hyde Park. When his mother died, the family moved to Sutton, Surrey, where Derek attended Sutton County School. When he left school he became a trainee scientific instrument maker. He had been a very active aero-modeller and helped to form the Sutton Model Aircraft Club. After the war he was selected to be a member of the British Wakefield Cup team, a prestigious aero modelling competition held that year in Akron, Ohio. He first flew in an Avro 504 as a passenger at the age of four.

Royal Air Force
Piggott joined the Royal Air Force in 1942 as aircrew and made a first solo in a de Havilland DH.82A Tiger Moth after only six hours dual. He completed his training in Canada and was commissioned as a Pilot Officer in 1943. He was then sent on a multi-engine instructors' course and then on a course for elementary instructors before returning to England. By 1944 there was a surplus of trained pilots and he volunteered to fly military gliders. After a short conversion to the Airspeed Horsa, General Aircraft Hotspur, and Waco Hadrian, he was posted to India and then on to Burma where he flew Douglas Dakotas dropping supplies to front-line troops. During his stay in India, he instructed Indian Air Force students and flew low anti-riot patrols just before partition.

Back in the UK he was posted as a Staff Instructor at the Central Flying School at RAF Little Rissington where he trained instructors and flew North American Harvards, Boulton Paul Balliols, Avro Athenas, Gloster Meteors, Supermarine Spitfires, de Havilland Mosquitos, and Avro Lancasters. After being awarded an A1 Instructor Rating, he joined the Home Command Gliding Instructors' School at Detling teaching civilian instructors for the Air Training Corps on Slingsby T.21 and Slingsby Kirby Cadet gliders. As Chief Flying Instructor he introduced training methods that greatly improved safety. He also taught school teachers in the Combined Cadet Force how to teach flying in primary gliders. In 1953 Piggott received the Queen's Commendation for Valuable Service in the Air for work on developing and introducing new instructional techniques for gliding in the ATC.

Gliding career
In 1953, he left the RAF as a Flight Lieutenant and was the Chief Flying Instructor (CFI) for Lasham Gliding Society between 1953 and 1989, though he took breaks during this time to do stunt flying. 
He travelled widely, lecturing and advising gliding associations such as the Soaring Society of America and the Dutch gliding association on instructional techniques such as the use of motor gliders in training. As a leading authority on gliding, he wrote seven books on the subject, an autobiography, several monographs, and many magazine articles. His first book 'Gliding' was first published in 1958 and an eighth edition in 2002.

He holds the FAI Diamond Badge. In 2003 at the age of 81, he completed a  task in a Fedorov Me7 Mechta glider with only a  span in a national competition in a time of 7hr 14min. (Several much younger pilots with superior machines failed to complete this task). He ceased regularly flying gliders solo in December 2012 but had one last Hurrah in an EoN Baby at Lyveden in August 2013, and no longer holds a full Private Pilot Licence (PPL).

He was a member of a test group for the British Gliding Association (BGA) and tested a number of prototype gliders and foreign machines for approval to be imported. He made a successful emergency parachute descent from a damaged SZD-9 Bocian making him a member of the Caterpillar Club. He researched the effect of sub-gravity sensations as a cause for many serious and fatal gliding accidents.

Other flying
On 9 November 1961, flying SUMPAC (Southampton University's Man Powered Aircraft), Derek Piggott became the first person to make an officially authenticated take-off and flight in a man-powered aircraft.

He took a break from being a gliding instructor to become a stunt pilot and was also technical adviser on several feature films. His role as a stunt pilot, began in 1965 with the film The Blue Max which tells the story of the competitive rivalry between two German pilots in the First World War. He was enlisted as one of several pilots who helped recreate the live dog-fight scenes for the film. However, he was the only stunt pilot to agree to fly for the climax of the film in which the two rivals challenge each other to fly beneath the spans of a bridge over a river. Taking the role of both German pilots and with multiple takes from contrasting camera angles, he ended up flying through the wide span of this bridge in Ireland 15 times and 17 times through the narrower span. Piggott was able to fly through the arch reliably by aligning two scaffolding poles, one in the river and one on the far bank. The director had placed a flock of sheep next to the bridge so that they would scatter as the plane approached in order to demonstrate that the stunt was real and had not used models. However, by later takes, the sheep had become accustomed to the planes and continued to graze, and so they had to be scared by the shepherd.

In Darling Lilli, he was responsible for the majority of the designs of six replica aircraft and for supervising their construction in a period of nine weeks. Some of the dog fight scenes are considered to be among the best made. However, they had to be re-shot the following year because the film was changed from being comic to serious.

Another notable film role, was Derek Piggott's contribution to Those Magnificent Men in Their Flying Machines in which he flew and advised on the construction of several of the early aircraft recreated for use in the film. Many of the planes employed wing warping for control in roll, which involved re-discovering how to fly them safely without the better roll control that comes from the use of ailerons. Several of the aircraft had dangerous features and he had a number of narrow escapes.

In Villa Rides he had to crash an aircraft that was flying towards a cliff by making the undercarriage collapse.

Derek Piggott flew some or all the aerial stunts in several other films:
Von Richthofen and Brown (The Red Baron);
Agatha;
Slipstream;
You Can't Win 'Em All;
Chitty Chitty Bang Bang and for several television programmes. For one of these TV programmes a replica of the Sir George Cayley's first heavier-than-air flying machine was built in the early 1970s. The machine was flown by Derek Piggott at the original site in Brompton Dale in 1973 for a TV programme and again in 1985 for the IMAX film On the Wing.

Piggott Hook
Derek Piggott was the inventor of the "Piggott-Hook", which is designed to prevent air brakes opening on a launch. The system is installed in all new gliders built by DG Flugzeugbau

Death
Piggott died of a stroke, aged 96, on 6 January 2019.

Honours
In 1987 Derek Piggott was appointed a Member of the Most Excellent Order of the British Empire (MBE). In 2007 Derek Piggott was awarded the Royal Aero Club Gold Medal—the highest award for aviation in the UK. Also in 2007 the Royal Aeronautical Society appointed Derek Piggott an Honorary Companion of the Society. In 2008 he was awarded the Lilienthal Gliding Medal by the Fédération Aéronautique Internationale for outstanding service over many years to the sport of gliding.
In July 2016 Derek Piggott was appointed President of the BHPFC (British Human Powered Flying Club) in recognition of his pioneering achievements in the field of human powered aviation.

Bibliography
 
 
 
 
 
 
 
 

His monographs are:
 'Sub-gravity sensations and gliding accidents'
 'Stop worrying about stalling and spinning'
 'Using motor gliders for training glider pilots'
 'Ground launches'

References

External links
Lasham Gliding Society
Video interview with Derek Piggott
 

1922 births
2019 deaths
English aviators
Gliding in England
Glider pilots
Members of the Order of the British Empire
Aviation writers
Royal Air Force officers
People from Romford
Royal Air Force pilots of World War II
Lilienthal Gliding Medal recipients
Glider flight record holders
British aviation record holders
Stunt pilots
British flight instructors
Recipients of the Commendation for Valuable Service in the Air